is a song by Japanese-American singer-songwriter Hikaru Utada. Along with its English-language counterpart "Don't Think Twice", it serves as the ending theme song to the Square Enix video game, Kingdom Hearts III. "Chikai" first appeared on Utada's seventh Japanese-language studio album, Hatsukoi, and was also included on the setlist of their Laughter In The Dark Tour.

The song and the English version "Don't Think Twice" were released as a B-side of the single "Face My Fears" as a CD single on January 18, 2019, making it their first release on the format in eleven years since their 2008 single "Prisoner of Love". It is also their first release with original English songs since "This Is the One" in 2009.

Promotion
On September 17, Utada performed "Chikai" live for the first time at Music Station Super FES 2018.

Commercial performance
The song reached No. 8 in the Oricon download chart in the release week, despite the song not being released as a single officially to the date. In Billboard Japan, it peaked at No. 51 in Japan Hot 100 and No. 10 in the Download Songs chart. Internationally, it's the best-selling Utada single to the date. In the iTunes store, it peaked No. 39 in the North American, No. 3 in Chile, No. 7 in Colombia and charted in up to 10 countries.

Charts

Weekly charts

Sales and certifications

References

Hikaru Utada songs
Kingdom Hearts songs
Songs written by Hikaru Utada
Disney songs
Video game theme songs
2018 songs
2018 singles